Harry Collinge High School (HCHS) is a public high school located in Hinton, Alberta, Canada. Founded in 1957 as Hardisty School, it was renamed in 1969 as Harry Collinge High School after Harry Collinge, the first manager of North Western Pulp and Power (now Hinton Pulp - A Division of West Fraser Mills Ltd).

References

External links 
 Harry Collinge High School

Hinton, Alberta
High schools in Alberta
Educational institutions established in 1957
1957 establishments in Alberta